Airport Security Police may refer to:
 Airport Security Police (Argentina)
 Airport Security Police (Bermuda)

See also 
 Airport security